Brothers is an unincorporated community in Deschutes County, Oregon, United States on U.S. Route 20. It is part of the Bend, Oregon Metropolitan Statistical Area.

History

Originally a stagecoach stop between Burns and Prineville, the Brothers Stage Stop was built in 1912. It was a gas station, restaurant, and post office up until around 2018.   It has  has changed owners a few times over the years and is currently not in operation.  .

Brothers post office was established in 1913. One source says that the name comes from several families of brothers who settled in the area, including the Stenkamp Brothers and Varco(e) Brothers, while another notes that there was a local Three Brothers Sheep Camp, named for three nearby hills that had the Three Sisters mountains looming behind them.

Climate
This region experiences warm (but not hot) and dry summers, with no average monthly temperatures above 71.6 °F.  According to the Köppen Climate Classification system, Brothers has a steppe climate, abbreviated "BSk" on climate maps.

Transportation
In the 21st century, Brothers is a stop on the Eastern POINT intercity bus line between Bend and Ontario. It makes one stop per day in each direction.

Education
In 1969 the local school had eight students.

References

External links 
 Historic photo of Brothers School from Salem Public Library
 Wired News article on technology-assisted learning in Brothers

Populated places established in 1913
Unincorporated communities in Deschutes County, Oregon
1913 establishments in Oregon
Unincorporated communities in Oregon